The thoracic spinal nerve 11 (T11) is a spinal nerve of the thoracic segment.

It originates from the spinal column from below the thoracic vertebra 11 (T11).

References

Spinal nerves